Guamaré is a municipality in the state of Rio Grande do Norte in the Northeast region of Brazil.

Douglas Júnior, one of the key players in Kazakhstan's journey to fourth place in the 2021 FIFA Futsal World Cup, was born there.

See also
List of municipalities in Rio Grande do Norte

References

Municipalities in Rio Grande do Norte
Populated coastal places in Rio Grande do Norte